Peritaxia is a genus of broad-nosed weevils in the beetle family Curculionidae. There are about seven described species in Peritaxia.

Species
These seven species belong to the genus Peritaxia:
 Peritaxia brevipilis Van Dyke, 1935 i c g
 Peritaxia elongata Pierce, 1913 i c g
 Peritaxia hispida Horn, 1876 i c g b
 Peritaxia longipennis Van Dyke, 1951 i c g
 Peritaxia perforata Casey, 1888 i c g
 Peritaxia rugicollis Horn, 1876 i c g
 Peritaxia uniformis (Van Dyke, 1936) i c g
Data sources: i = ITIS, c = Catalogue of Life, g = GBIF, b = Bugguide.net

References

Further reading

 
 
 
 

Entiminae
Articles created by Qbugbot